The YMBA, or Young Men's Buddhist Association, was created in Sri Lanka in 1898. The main founder was C. S. Dissanayake as part of a bid to provide Buddhist institutions as an alternative to YMCA, otherwise known as the Young Men's Christian Association. It has had many famous presidents such as philanthropists Ernest de Silva and Henry Woodward Amarasuriya. It also exists in other countries, although they seem to be independent organizations.

See also
 Young Men's Buddhist Association (Burma)

References

Further reading
 Tessa J. Bartholomeuz.In Defense of Dharma: Just-War Ideology in Buddhist Sri Lanka. RoutledgeCurzon, NY: New York, 2002.

External links
 YMBA Kolonnawa, Sri Lanka
 YMBA Colombo, Sri Lanka
 YMBA Maharagama, Sri Lanka
 YMBA Dehiwala-MtLavinia, Sri Lanka
 Young Men's Buddhist Association America
 YMBA New Delhi, India

Buddhist youth organizations
Religious organisations based in Sri Lanka
1898 establishments in Ceylon
Child-related organisations in Sri Lanka
Religious organizations established in 1898
Men's religious organizations